Michael Östen Andersson (born 24 August 1959) is a Swedish former football player and manager, he previously worked as CEO of Hammarby IF

Playing career
Born in Brännkyrka, Stockholm, Andersson started his career in Älvsjö AIK before transferring to Hammarby IF in Allsvenskan. During his years at IFK Göteborg the team won Swedish Championship and the UEFA Cup in 1987. He was also capped 8 times for the Swedish national football team.

Managerial career
As manager Andersson has managed Djurgårdens IF and Malmö FF. He has also been Sports Director at IFK Norrköping and later CEO at Hammarby IF.

References

External links

1959 births
Living people
Association football midfielders
Swedish footballers
Sweden international footballers
Sweden under-21 international footballers
Sweden youth international footballers
Footballers at the 1988 Summer Olympics
Olympic footballers of Sweden
Hammarby Fotboll players
IFK Göteborg players
Swedish football managers
Djurgårdens IF Fotboll managers
Malmö FF managers
UEFA Cup winning players
Boo FK managers
Footballers from Stockholm